"Come on Baby" is the first official single from Saigon's début album The Greatest Story Never Told. The song features Swizz Beatz on the hook and was produced by Just Blaze. The album version featuring a verse by Jay-Z from the remix version. The song samples The J. Geils Band's "Southside Shuffle". The song was released as a single on July 14, 2007. The video made its debut on 106 & Park on November 8, 2007.

Remix
The official remix features two new verses by Saigon, a verse from Jay-Z,  and Swizz Beatz's original hook was released on November 6, 2007.  Jay-Z's verse was included as the second verse on the album version of the song, replacing Saigon's original third verse.

Asher Roth recorded a song over the same instrumental entitled "Rick Smits", and west coast artists Planet Asia and Fashawn have also recorded over the instrumental.

Samples and film references
 "Come On Baby" sampled J. Geils Band's "Southside Shuffle" (Atlantic, 1973), using the riff at 0:07 in the song.
 "Come On Baby" appears in the 2009 film Fighting, in the Bronx arrival scene at 33:30.

References

2007 singles
Swizz Beatz songs
Atlantic Records singles
Song recordings produced by Just Blaze
2007 songs
Songs written by Just Blaze
Songs written by Swizz Beatz
Songs written by Jay-Z